Richa, also rendered rucha, refers to a shloka (couplet) or mantra, usually two to four sentences long, found in the Sanskrit religious scriptures, the Vedas. It is a term used to refer to each verse of the Rigveda.

Etymology 
The etymological origin of the richa is the Sanskrit word ruc (ऋच्), which means to praise. Richa, is therefore, one ruc after the other. Other meanings of ruc are splendour, worship, or a hymn. Richa can also refer to a verbal composition of celestial sounds called shrutis; the Gayatri Mantra is a rucha as well.

Literature

Rigveda 
In the Rigveda, the richa refers to individual verses, which are collected into a sukta, translated as a hymn. The suktas are combined into the 10 mandalas, the books of the Rigveda. For example, the famous Purusha sukta has 16 richas. It is the 90th sukta of the 10th mandala of the Rigveda. The Rigveda contains about 10,600 richas, organised into 191 suktas. The other three Vedas use a similar terminology.

One of the richas is composed in praise of the dawn:

Another richa is composed in praise of the night:

References 

Hindu mantras
Mantras